Alqurat Rural District is in the Central District of Birjand County, South Khorasan province, Iran. At the National Census of 2006, its population was 8,236 in 2,546 households. There were 12,026 inhabitants in 3,876 households at the following census of 2011. At the most recent census of 2016, the population of the rural district was 9,479 in 3,159 households. The largest of its 71 villages was Dastgerd, with 3,365 people.

References 

Birjand County

Rural Districts of South Khorasan Province

Populated places in South Khorasan Province

Populated places in Birjand County